Lappersdorf is a municipality in the district of Regensburg, in Bavaria, Germany. It is situated on the river Regen, 4 km north of Regensburg.

References

Regensburg (district)